Union Baptist Church may refer to:

Union Baptist Church (Hartford, Connecticut), listed on the NRHP in Connecticut
Union Baptist Church (Baltimore, Maryland), listed on the NRHP in Maryland
Union Baptist Church (New Bedford, Massachusetts), listed on the NRHP in Massachusetts
Union Baptist Church (New Rochelle, New York)
Union Baptist Church (Cincinnati, Ohio)
Union Baptist Cemetery (Cincinnati, Ohio), listed on the NRHP in Ohio
West Union Baptist Church, West Union, Oregon, listed on the NRHP in Oregon
Union Baptist Church (Allentown, Pennsylvania)